Lajedo is a municipality and a city in the state of Pernambuco in Brazil. The population is 40,589 (2020 est.) in an area of 189.10 km². The city area is 3.5 km².

Geography

 Boundaries - São Bento do Una and Cachoeirinha  (N);  Canhotinho   (S);   Ibirajuba  (E);  Calçado   (W).
 Elevation - 661 m
 Hydrography - Una and Mundaú River
 Vegetation - Caatinga hiperxerófila
 Annual average temperature - 21.9 c
 Distance to Recife - 192 km

Economy

The main economic activities in Lajedo are industry, commerce and agribusiness, especially farming of cattle, goats, pigs, sheep, chickens; and plantations of beans and manioc.

Economic Indicators

Economy by Sector
2006

Health Indicators

Villages 

 Agrovila Rural
 Cantinho
 Imaculada
 Pau-Ferro
 Pereiro
 Prata
 Quatis
 Retiro
 Santa Luzia
 Olho d'Água dos Pombos

References

Municipalities in Pernambuco